Kate Bush (often called Amiga due to the label's appearance on the front cover) is the first compilation album by Kate Bush. It was released exclusively in East Germany in 1984 by Amiga and contains tracks from her first three studio albums The Kick Inside, Lionheart and Never for Ever. Although being released two years after The Dreaming, it doesn't contain any songs from the album.

The album cover depicts Bush under an orange light, appearing to be an outtake of the Hammer Horror single cover.

Track listing

References 

1984 compilation albums
Kate Bush albums